Raphael Camidoh Kofi Attachie (born 21 January 1994) known by the stage name Camidoh is a Ghanaian Afropop, R&B and Afrobeats songwriter and musician.

Early life and education 
Camidoh was born in Aflao in the Volta Region of Ghana and raised by a single mother in Ho, the capital of Volta Region, Ghana. From 2008 to 2012 Camidoh obtained his secondary education from Bishop Herman College, in Kpando Kpando Municipal District where he majored in General Arts. He furthered his education at the University of Professional Studies in Accra, Ghana, graduating with Bachelor of Science degree in Marketing.

Career 
In 2018 Camidoh was signed by Grind Don't Stop Records. In that same year, Camidoh released his first single titled For My Lover which featured Darkovibes. He subsequently released The Best which featured Kelvyn Boy and Available featuring Eugy. In 2021, he released a single which featured BET award nominee Kwesi Arthur titled Dance With You. In 2020, he released six–track EP titled Contingency Plan (C.P.).

In March 2021 Camidoh performed at the Entertainment Achievement Awards organized by Citi TV. His extended play, Contingency Plan (C.P.) was nominated for the Album of the Year. After his performance, earned him admiration from IMANI chief executive officer, Franklin Cudjoe who dashed him $500.

He rose to prominence in between 2021 and 2022, when he released his single Sugarcane in December 2021. The song began to trend more after the Ghanaian TikTok video creators community used the song in their videos, serving as a way of promoting the song online. The song was number 5 on Shazam's top 200 most searched Afropop songs. On 8 April 2022, he released a remix of the song featuring King Promise, Nigerian artiste Mayorkun and British rapper Darkoo. In the first week of May, barely a month after its release, the collaboration peaked at Number 1 on Nigeria's Top 100 Music Chart on Apple Music.

Artistry and musical influences 
Prior to starting his music career, Camidoh came across music from Senegalese-American artist Akon on music streaming website YouTube when he was in an internet café with his cousin. He was inspired to go into music and due to that he cites Akon as his musical inspiration and

influence.

In February 2022, in a Twitter Space interview with Ghanaian social media influencer KalyJay, Akon mentioned "I have heard that song [Sugarcane]. That record is massive,"..."I have that record. It is one of my top ten records that I play every day."

Discography

Selected singles 
 For My Lover ft. Darkovibes (2018)
 The Best ft. Kelvyn Boy (2019)
 TikTok (Available) ft. Eugy (2020)
 Maria (2020)
 Dance With You ft. Kwesi Arthur (2021)
 Sugarcane ft. Phantom (2021)
 Sugarcane (Remix) (ft. King Promise, Mayorkun & Darkoo) (2022)

Album and EP 
 Contingency Plan (C.P.) 2020

Awards and nominations

References 
 

Living people
21st-century Ghanaian singers
Ghanaian male singers
Ghanaian Afrobeat musicians
University of Professional Studies alumni
Ghanaian male singer-songwriters
People from Volta Region
1994 births
Bishop Herman College alumni